Aschersoniodoxa is a genus of flowering plants belonging to the family Brassicaceae.

Its native range is Peru to Northwestern Argentina.

Species:

Aschersoniodoxa cachensis 
Aschersoniodoxa mandoniana 
Aschersoniodoxa pilosa

References

Brassicaceae
Brassicaceae genera